Mala Murthy is a Professor in the Princeton Neuroscience Institute at Princeton University. Her work centers around how the brain extracts important information from the sensory world and utilises that information to modulate behavior in a social context. She is most known for her work in acoustic communication and song production in courting Drosophila fruit flies. Murthy and colleagues have also published an automated system (LEAP and SLEAP) for measuring animal pose in movies with one or more animal.

Education 
Prof. Murthy received her B.S. in Biology from MIT. She was a Burchards scholar in the humanities and won the John L. Asinari prize for outstanding undergraduate research in the life sciences. She then received her PhD in Neuroscience from Stanford University, working with Thomas Schwarz and Richard Scheller. Her thesis research centered on mechanisms of vesicle trafficking to cell membranes. She did postdoctoral work in systems neuroscience with Gilles Laurent at Caltech as a Helen Hay Whitney fellow stereotypy in the central brain of Drosophila, in a region of the brain important for learning in memory.

Awards and recognition 

 The National Science Foundation CAREER Award
 Alfred P. Sloan fellowship
 Klingenstein fellowship
 McKnight Scholar award
 NINDS Research Program award
 Faculty Scholars at Howard Hughes Medical Institute (2016)

References 

American neuroscientists
Living people
Princeton University faculty
Massachusetts Institute of Technology School of Science alumni
Stanford University alumni
American women scientists
1975 births
American women academics
21st-century American women